Adonis Kemp (born January 31, 1967) is a Dutch baseball player who represented the Netherlands at the 1996 Summer Olympics.

In 2021 Kemp was the third base coach for Twins Oosterhout of the Honkbal Hoofdklasse.

References

External links
 

1967 births
Living people
Dutch baseball players
Olympic baseball players of the Netherlands
Baseball players at the 1996 Summer Olympics
Dutch people of Aruban descent